Arne Weverling (born 30 August 1974, in The Hague) is a Dutch politician. As a member of the People's Party for Freedom and Democracy (VVD) he has been an MP since 23 March 2017.

References 

People's Party for Freedom and Democracy politicians
Living people
1974 births
21st-century Dutch politicians
Politicians from The Hague
Members of the House of Representatives (Netherlands)